The 1974 IFA Shield Final was the 78th final of the IFA Shield, the second oldest football competition in India, and was contested between Kolkata giants East Bengal and Mohun Bagan on 29 September 1974 at the Mohun Bagan Ground in Kolkata.

East Bengal won the final 1–0 to claim their 13th IFA Shield title. Subhash Bhowmick scored the only goal in the final as East Bengal lifted their third consecutive IFA Shield title.

Route to the final

Match

Summary
The IFA Shield final began at the Mohun Bagan Ground in Kolkata on 29 September 1974 in front of a packed crowd as two Kolkata giants East Bengal and Mohun Bagan faced each other in the Kolkata Derby. East Bengal started as the favorites as they were the defending champions from the last two editions and had already won the 1973 Calcutta Football League. The game started as expected, with East Bengal dominating the proceedings. Mohun Bagan custodian Prashanta Mitra made four terrific saves to keep the mariners in the game. The only goal of the game came in the fortieth minute when Mohammed Habib freed himself out wide from a short corner from Samaresh Chowdhury and put in a measured cross which was headed into the goal by Subhash Bhowmick. East Bengal managed to create some more chances in the second half but was denied by Prashanta Mitra. The scoreline remained the same until the full time as East Bengal lifted their third consecutive IFA Shield title and also managed to secure a third consecutive League and Shield double.

Details

See also
IFA Shield Finals

References

IFA Shield finals
1974–75 in Indian football
East Bengal Club matches
Mohun Bagan AC matches